Saeid Aboutaleb is an Iranian documentary filmmaker and conservative politician who served a member of the Parliament of Iran from 2004 to 2008 representing Tehran, Rey, Shemiranat and Eslamshahr.

U.S. detainment in Iraq
While on mission with the Islamic Republic of Iran Broadcasting during 2003 invasion of Iraq, Aboutaleb along with the reporter Soheil Karimi, and their interpreter and driver were detained by American forces and held captive from 1 July to 4 November 2003.

Views
Aboutaleb was a critic of Mahmoud Ahmadinejad.

References

1969 births
Living people
Politicians from Tehran
Members of the 7th Islamic Consultative Assembly
Deputies of Tehran, Rey, Shemiranat and Eslamshahr
Alliance of Builders of Islamic Iran politicians
Iranian documentary filmmakers
War correspondents of the Iraq War
Iranian people imprisoned abroad